Filipe Cruz may refer to:
Filipe Cruz (handballer) (born 1969), Angolan handballer coach and former player
Filipe Cruz (footballer) (born 2002), Portuguese footballer